John Bruce Dal Canton (June 15, 1941 – October 7, 2008) was a major league pitcher for the Pittsburgh Pirates (1967–70), Kansas City Royals (1971–75), Atlanta Braves (1975–76), and Chicago White Sox (1977).

Career
Dal Canton's career path to the major leagues was unusual in that he was signed by the Pittsburgh Pirates as the result of an open tryout.  Dal Canton was teaching high school at Burgettstown JR / SR high school in Burgettstown, Pennsylvania at the time of his signing. In eleven seasons he had a 51–49 win–loss record, 316 games (83 starts), 15 complete games, 2 shutouts, 102 games finished, 19 saves, 931.1 innings pitched, 894 hits allowed, 442 runs allowed, 380 earned runs allowed, 48 home runs allowed, 391 walks, 485 strikeouts, 23 hit batsmen, 46 wild pitches, 4,030 batters faced, 55 intentional walks, 5 balks, a 3.67 ERA and a 1.380 WHIP. He led the American League in wild pitches (16) in 1974.

Dal Canton was traded along with Freddie Patek and Jerry May from the Pirates to the Royals for Jackie Hernández, Bob Johnson and Jim Campanis at the Winter Meetings on December 2, 1970.

From 1987 to 1990, he was the Braves pitching coach.

Dal Canton threw a knuckleball which Wilbur Wood helped teach him.

Death
Bruce Dal Canton died on October 7, 2008, in Pittsburgh, Pennsylvania, aged 67, of esophageal cancer.

Legacy
On Friday, June 11, 2004, Dal Canton was inducted into the Pennsylvania Sports Hall of Fame. During Opening Day ceremonies on April 9, 2009, the Myrtle Beach Pelicans honored Bruce, who had been their pitching coach since 1999. The Pelicans' clubhouse was officially named in his memory and Dal Canton's number, 43, was retired. He was inducted into the California University of Pennsylvania Athletic Hall of Fame in 1995, and spent more than a decade as a coach in the Braves organization.

Dal Canton once threw a Perfect Game striking out every batter in a 7 inning high school game except for the shortstop who bunted and was thrown out at first.

References

External links

 The 100 Greatest Royals of All-Time- #75 Bruce Dal Canton

1941 births
2008 deaths
People from California, Pennsylvania
Major League Baseball pitchers
Atlanta Braves players
Chicago White Sox players
Kansas City Royals players
Pittsburgh Pirates players
Baseball players from Pennsylvania
California Vulcans baseball players
Atlanta Braves coaches
Chicago White Sox scouts
Major League Baseball pitching coaches
Deaths from esophageal cancer
Deaths from cancer in Pennsylvania